Cypraeovula algoensis is a species of sea snail, a cowry, a marine gastropod mollusk in the family Cypraeidae, the cowries.

Subspecies
 Cypraeovula algoensis algoensis (Gray, 1825)
 Cypraeovula algoensis liltvedi Lorenz, 2017
 Cypraeovula algoensis namibiensis Massier, 2006
 Cypraeovula algoensis permarginata Lorenz, 1989

Description

Distribution

References

 Chiapponi M. (1999) A conchological intermediate between Cypraeovula edentula and C. algoensis (Mollusca: Gastropoda: Cypraeidae). Schriften zur Malakozoologie 13: 41–42.
 Steyn, D.G & Lussi, M. (2005). Offshore Shells of Southern Africa: A pictorial guide to more than 750 Gastropods. Published by the authors. Pp. i–vi, 1–289.
A guide to the gastropod family Cypraeidae. Volume 1, Biology and systematics

Cypraeidae
Taxa named by John Edward Gray